Wohnroder Bach is a river of Bavaria, Germany. It is a headstream of the Fellach.

See also
List of rivers of Bavaria

References

Rivers of Bavaria
Rivers of Germany

de:Fellach (Aura)#Quellbäche